Salvadora hexalepis, the western patch-nosed snake, is a species of non-venomous colubrid snake, which is endemic to the southwestern United States and northern Mexico.

Geographic range
It is found in the southwestern United States in the states of Arizona, southern California, Nevada, southern New Mexico, and southwestern Texas.  It is also found in northern Mexico in the Mexican states of Baja California, Baja California Sur, Chihuahua, Sinaloa, and Sonora.

Subspecies
The following four subspecies are recognized:

 Salvadora hexalepis hexalepis (Cope, 1866)
 Salvadora hexalepis klauberi Bogert, 1945
 Salvadora hexalepis mojavensis Bogert, 1945
 Salvadora hexalepis virgultea Bogert, 1935

Description

They have a distinctive, thick scale curved back over the top of the snout, and free at the edges.

All subspecies are yellowish with blackish lateral stripes in various arrangements.

The dorsal scales are smooth, and the anal plate is divided.

Behavior
The western patch-nosed snake inhabits arid deserts in its area. It feeds upon lizards, snakes, reptile eggs, and small rodents.

Reproduction
4-10 eggs are laid during spring or early summer and hatch in August through September.

References

Further reading
 Bogert, C.M. 1935. "Salvadora grahamiae virgultea, a new subspecies of the patch-nosed snake". Bull. Southern California Acad. Sci. 34 (1): 88-94.
 Bogert, C.M. 1939. "A Study of the Genus Salvadora, the Patch-nosed Snakes". Publ. Univ. California at Los Angeles 1: 177-236.
 Bogert, C.M. "Two additional races of the patch-nosed snake, Salvadora hexalepis ". American Mus. Novitates (1285): 1-14. (Salvadora hexalepis klauberi and Salvadora hexalepis mojavensis, new subspecies)
 Cope, E.D. 1866. "On the REPTILIA and BATRACHIA of the Sonoran Province of the Nearctic Region". Proc. Acad. Nat. Sci. Philadelphia 18: 300-314. ("Phimothyra hexalepis n. sp. nov. [sic]", p. 304.)

Colubrids
Articles containing video clips
Snakes of North America
Reptiles of Mexico
Reptiles of the United States
Reptiles described in 1866